Baldomero Fernández Ladreda (18 July 1906 – 15 November 1947) was a Communist Party of Spain politician. He fought in the Spanish Civil War on the side of the Second Spanish Republic. He was executed by garrote vil by the government of Francisco Franco.

References

1906 births
1947 deaths
Communist Party of Spain politicians
People executed by Francoist Spain
People executed by ligature strangulation
Spanish military personnel of the Spanish Civil War (Republican faction)
Executed Spanish people
Executed politicians
Executed military personnel
Place of birth missing